Manhattan Heights (Chinese: 高逸華軒) is a residential skyscraper located in Kennedy Town, Hong Kong. The architect of this building is SLHO & Associates Ltd.

Part of the building is being operated as a serviced apartment.

See also
List of tallest buildings in Hong Kong

References

External links
 Manhattan Heights Serviced Apartments

Residential buildings completed in 2000
Residential skyscrapers in Hong Kong